Circus Varianus was a Roman circus, possibly started during the reign of Caracalla, residing in the palatial villa complex known as the Sessorium, beside the Amphitheatrum Castrense. This circus has been identified as the space in which Elagabalus raced horses under the family name of Varius, lending the site the name of "Circus Varianus."  The remnants of the circus survive to the south of Porta Maggiore, next to the Aurelian Wall, near the church of Santa Croce in Gerusalemme. The dimensions of the circus measure 565 x 125 meters, just slightly smaller than the Circus Maximus (600 x 150 m).

According to records in the 16th century, an obelisk was found at the site, measuring 9.25 meters tall. It had originally been located at the temple dedicated to Antinous at Antinoöpolis and was moved in the reign of Elagabalus. After being discovered, the obelisk was moved to the Palazzo Barberini in 1633, from there to the Vatican in 1769, and reached Monte Pincio in 1822 where it resides currently.

See also
List of ancient monuments in Rome

References

Ancient Roman circuses in Rome